Adam Dodek is the current dean of the University of Ottawa Faculty of Law where he is also a full professor. Dodek has written books on the Canadian Constitution and solicitor-client privilege.

References

Academic staff of the University of Ottawa
Living people
Year of birth missing (living people)